Dang Bireley's and Young Gangsters (Thai: 2499 อันธพาลครองเมือง or 2499 Antapan Krong Muang; literally: 2499 Gangsters Rule the City) is a 1997 crime drama film about young Thai gangsters in 1950s Thailand. Featuring John Woo-style heroic bloodshed, it was the debut film from director Nonzee Nimibutr and was the first screenplay by director and screenwriter Wisit Sasanatieng.

The 2499 in the Thai title refers to the year in the Buddhist calendar when the story starts, corresponding to the Gregorian year 1956.

Plot

Dang, the son of a prostitute, growing up in 1950s Thailand, compensates for his inferiority complex by boosting up his ego. At the age of 13, he killed a man who was beating his mother. By age 16, he had dropped out of school and started his own protection racket. With his right-hand man Lam Sing, Dang is highly protective of Piak, and is also friends with Pu Bottle Bomb and Pu's sidekick Dum.

Dang attracts the attention of a young night club singer named Wallapa, who pressures Dang to stop being a gangster and live a normal life. Dang's mother also wishes that he would stop being gangster and ordain as a Buddhist monk.

Dang carves out more territory by killing the local crime boss Mad Dog. Meanwhile, Piak is caught up in a fight between rival school gangs, instigated by Pu and Dum. The fight leads to a falling out between Dang and Pu the beginning of a feud between the two. Following a military coup all the gangsters must leave Bangkok for the countryside, Dang, Lam Sing and Piak go to work for Sergeant Chien, a former policeman turned gangster, at Chien's bar and gambling den next to an American military base. Chien needs more muscle to go against a rival operator, Headman Tek, and brings in Pu and Dum against Dang's wishes. Pu and Dum stir up trouble in the gambling den and reignite their feud with Dang's gang although Sergeant Chein tries to calm them. However Sergeant Chien is killed by a motorcyclist gunman and Pu and Dum go to work with his rival Headman Tek forcing Dang's gang out of the town.

Dang returns to Bangkok, where he plans on fulfilling his mother's wishes and taking his oath as a monk. However Pu and Dum show up during the ceremony and gun battle ensues. Lam Sing is killed, and Dang and Piak are wounded, but Pu and Dum are killed.

In an epilogue, narrated by an older Piak, it turns out Dang  survived his wounds, but continued as a gangster seemingly unable to become a monk, and then died in a car accident at age 24, just like his idol James Dean.

Cast
Jessadaporn Pholdee as Dang, Dang Bireley
Noppachai Muttaweevong as Lam Sing
Attaporn Teemakorn as Piak, Piak Wisut Kasat
Supakorn Kitsuwon as Pu, Pu Bottle Bomb
Chartchai Ngamsan as Dum, Dum Esso
Champagne X as Wallapa
Apichart Choosakul as Sergeant Chien
Parichart Borsudhi as Dang's mother
Piya Bunnak as Pol, Pol Trok Thawai
Teerachai Plugpimarn as Mad Dog
Suthakorn Jaimun as Headman Tek

Popularity and the talk of the town
When this film was released it was immediately popular. Because it is different from other Thai films in the same era, due to it was made realistically and met international standards. It has been recognized as a film that truly opens a new era for the Thai film industry. It was loosely based on Suriyan Saktaisong's crime fiction Sen Tang Mafia (เส้นทางมาเฟีย;  literally: Mafia Way). Every character is a real person. When released, it became a debated topic in Thai society about the historical truth and the scene that appeared in the film. Which many people who confirm themselves to know Dang Bireley insist that  Dang does not have individuality like in the film at all including many scenes did not actually happen.

Awards and nominations
The film won Best Picture and Best Director at the Thailand National Film Association Awards. At the 1997 Vancouver International Film Festival, it was nominated for a Dragons and Tigers award.

Release
The film premiered on Friday, April 11, 1997.

It is back to screen again in 25 years on July 7, 2022 in the form of an outdoor cinema at Townspeople Plaza near the Giant Swing and the Bangkok City Hall in the project of Bangkok’s Anticipated Film Fest, that is a project of Bangkok Metropolitan Administration (BMA) by the governor Chadchart Sittipunt with outdoor film screenings (emphasis on Thai films) in different places, alternating with each other by Dang Bireley's and Young Gangsters being the first that started.

References

External links
 
 Dang Bireley's and Young Gangsters at the Thai Film Database
 Thai Film Reviews by Simon Booth
 

1997 films
1997 crime drama films
Thai crime drama films
Thai-language films
Films set in 1956
Films set in 1957
Films set in Bangkok
Best Picture Suphannahong National Film Award winners
Thai national heritage films
1997 directorial debut films
Films based on Thai novels